England Squash is recognised by Sport England as the English national governing body of the racket sports of squash and squash 57. Based at the National Squash Centre in Manchester, it aims to increase participation in both sports.

History
The Squash Rackets Association was founded in 1928, to take over the administration of the game from the Tennis and Rackets Association. In 1934, the separate Women’s Squash Rackets Association was formed. These associations looked after squash in Great Britain until 1980, when responsibility for Scotland and Wales passed to autonomous national associations. The English SRA and Women's SRA amalgamated in 1989.

The SRA was the recognised world authority for squash until the formation, in 1967, of the International Squash Rackets Federation (which became the World Squash Federation in 1992). In 1988, the British Racketball Association merged with the SRA.

In 2001, the SRA was re-launched as England Squash, becoming England Squash & Racketball in 2009. Long-term chief executive, Nick Rider, left in 2014 and in 2015, the racketball name was dropped from its title.

See also
 Squash in England
 Premier Squash League
 England men's national squash team
 England women's national squash team
 British Junior Open Squash
 British Open Squash Championships

References

Squash
Squash in England
1928 establishments in England
Sports organizations established in 1928
Organisations based in Manchester
National members of the World Squash Federation